This is a list of shopping malls in Pakistan. This list contains some of the most notable shopping malls in the country, each with its own unique offerings and qualities.

Balochistan

Quetta
Millennium Mall
Gold City Mall
Balochistan Askari Mall
Complex of Quetta

Islamabad Capital Territory

Completed 
The Centaurus
Giga Mall
 Safa Gold Mall
Amazon Mall
The Olympus

Under-construction/Proposed 
 The Magnus Mall, Gulberg Islamabad 
 The Sixth Boulevard, Mall & Apartment
 The Nexus Mall
 Gulberg Mall & Signature Living, Gulberg Islamabad 
 Skypark One, Gulberg Islamabad 
 Opal Mall
 Gulberg Arena, Gulberg Islamabad 
 Gulberg Heights, Gulberg Islamabad 
 Prism Heights, Gulberg Islamabad 
 Gevora International Hotel & Mall, Gulberg Islamabad 
 Winston Mall
 The Gate
 J7 Icon 
 J7 Emporium 
 Mall of Islamabad
 The Shopping Mall (TSM)
 The Aquatic Mall

Khyber Pakhtunkhwa

Peshawar

 Dean’s Shopping Mall
 Central Mall 
 Peshawar Mall
 Great Wall Shopping Mall
 Marina Mall
 Al-Fatah Shopping Mall
 Bhittani Plaza
 091 Mall 
 Florenza Mall

Mardan

 The Mall of Mardan
 Max Mall Mardan
 Ocean Mall
 United Mall
 Millennium Mall Mardan
 Khaksar

Mingora

 Swat Shopping Mall

Kohat

 Mall of Kohat

Dera Ismail Khan

 Aashiana Shopping Center
 Huzaifa Trade Center

Abbotabad

 Al-Faisal Shopping Mall
 Civic Shopping Center
 Abbot City Mall

Mansehra

 Mansehra Trade Center

Hangu 

 Mall of Hangu

Punjab

Lahore
Emporium Mall
Packages Mall
Fortress Square
Mall of Lahore
 Amanah Mall
Avenue Mall
 Xinhua Mall
Gulberg Galleria
 Siddiq Trade Center
 Imperial Mall
Pace Shopping Mall
Vogue Towers
Al Fatah Malls (3 malls)

Faisalabad
The Grand Central Mall, Faisalabad
The Boulevard Mall
The Grand Atrium Shopping Mall Faisalabad

Sitara Mall
Kohinoor Shopping Mall
Do Burj Shopping Mall
Paradise Atrium 
Pearl City Shopping Mall
The Edge Mall
Saira shopping Mall
Lyallpur Galleria
The Grand Atrium
Chase Up Mall
Misaq Ul Mall
Gutwala Commercial Hub
Al Fatah Malls (2 Malls)

Gujranwala
Kings Mall
Mall Of Gujranwala'''
Fazal Centre
Aleena Shopping Mall
Prisma Mall
Sixteenth Avenue Mall
Civic Centre
Nazir Centre
Chase Up Mall
 MAK Mall (Under Construction)

Gujrat
Alina center
Abdullah Mall
Glorious Mall GT Road Gujrat PH.03341830666
Server Gold
Mall of Gujrat

Mandi Bahauddin
Hakim Mall
Mall of Mandi Bahauddin

Multan
Mall of Multan
United Mall Gulgasht (Under Construction)
Centro Plaza Shopping Mall
Crystal Mall
Panorama Mall Multan
Citi Mall Multan 
The United Mall
Orient Mall 
SS Mall Multan Cantt
Anas

Sargodha
Mall of Sargodha
Burj Ismail Mall
Xin Mall
Chenone Tower
Burj Huraira Mall
Al-Rehman Trade Centre
Toheed Mall

Sialkot
Mall of Sialkot
Duran Shopping Mall
City Centre Sialkot
Kent Mall Shopping Centre
15 Div Shopping Centre

Sindh

Karachi

Lucky One Mall
Dolmen Malls
Crescent Bay
Ocean Mall and Tower
Port Grand
Omega Mall
Millennium Mall
Atrium Mall
Com-3 Mall
Star City Mall
The Place
Park Towers
Mall of Karachi
Ocean Mall
Northwalk
Emerald Tower
Deans Mall
Bahria Town Tower
The Forum Mall
Glamour One
Zamzama Mall
The Central Shopping Mall
Metro Shopping Mall
Defence Mall
Cliff Shopping Mall
The Center
Saima Paari Mall
Al-Madni Mall
Royal Defence Mall
Vincy Mall
Jumerah Mall
Al Najibi Mall
Saima Square one
Saima Mall
 RJ Mall Karachi
Samama Shopping Mall

Metropolitan Hyderabad

Boulevard Mall
Magnum Mall Hyderabad
MallOne Shopping Complex 
Hyderabad
Emerald Mall
Signature Tower & Mall
Apple Tower & Mall
Meridian Mall
Dawood Supermarket
Dawood Supermarket City
Max Buchat
National Mart
Abdullah Mall
Lucky Mall
Marhaba Supermarket
ChaseUp Hyderabad
Orient Mall Hyderabad

See also
List of largest shopping malls in the world
Malls in Islamabad
Malls in Peshawar
Shopping Malls In Lahore

References 

Mobile Mall Pakistan

Pakistan
Shopping malls